Bogdan Djuricic (31 May 1950, Ljubljana - 11 December 2008, Belgrade) was a Serbian biochemist.

His chief area of scientific research was in molecular mechanisms of programmed cell death and biochemistry of ischemia.

Education
In 1974, he graduated from the Belgrade Medical School and earned his Doctorate in medicine. In 1982 he received his Ph.D. at the Belgrade Medical School.

Teaching career
In 1995 he became a full professor  for biochemistry at the Faculty of medicine at the University of Belgrade.

Memberships
He was a member of the Serbian Academy of Sciences and Arts, Department of Medical Sciences, the Serbian Medical Society, and the Serbian Scientific Society.

Death
He died suddenly on 11 December 2008 in Belgrade at age 58.

See also
 Pavle Simić
 Milan Vukcevich
 Ljubisav Rakić
 Ivan Gutman
 Sima Lozanić
 Marko Leko
 Aleksandar Despić
 Ivan Gutman
 Milan Vukcevich
 Ljubisav Rakić
 Mihailo Rašković
 Zivojin Jocic
 Aleksandar M. Leko
 Milivoje Lozanić
 Dejan Popović Jekić
 Panta Tutundžić
 Vukić Mićović
 Persida Ilić
 Svetozar Lj. Jovanović
 Djordje K. Stefanović

1950 births
2008 deaths
Serbian biochemists
Scientists from Ljubljana
University of Belgrade Faculty of Medicine alumni
Academic staff of the University of Belgrade